The Colt AR-15 is a lightweight, magazine-fed, gas-operated semi-automatic rifle. It is a semi-automatic version of the M16 rifle sold for the civilian  and law enforcement markets in the United States. The AR in AR-15 stands for ArmaLite rifle, after the company that developed it in the 1950s. Colt's Manufacturing Company currently owns the AR-15 trademark, which is used exclusively for its line of semi-automatic AR-15 rifles.

History

Due to financial problems, and limitations in terms of manpower and production capacity, ArmaLite sold the AR-15 design and the AR-15 trademark along with the ArmaLite AR-10 to Colt's Manufacturing Company in 1959. Colt started selling the semi-automatic version of the M16 rifle as the Colt AR-15 in 1964. The first mass production version was the Colt AR-15 Sporter, in .223 Remington, with a 20-inch barrel, issued with 5-round magazines. Colt has since made many different models of AR-15 rifle and carbine models, including the AR-15, AR-15A2, AR-15A3, AR-15A4, and others.

Sale of new AR-15s in the USA was banned by the Federal Assault Weapons Ban from 1994 to 2004.  Colt and others continued to sell legally compliant versions during that period. On September 20, 2019, Colt announced that it would no longer produce the AR-15 for private use, due to market saturation. It would still produce the AR-15 for police and military units. By May 2020, changed market conditions encouraged Colt to resume production for sales to private users.

Operating mechanism

 describes the cycling mechanism used in the original AR-15. The bolt carrier acts as a movable cylinder and the bolt itself acts as a piston. This mechanism is often called "direct gas impingement" (DGI), although that is now considered to be a misconception. The mechanism is now referred to as an "internal gas piston operating system".

Gas is tapped from the barrel as the bullet moves past a gas port located above the rifle's front sight base. The gas expands into the port and down a gas tube, located above the barrel that runs from the front sight base into the AR-15's upper receiver. Here, the gas tube protrudes into a "gas key" (bolt carrier key), which accepts the gas and funnels it into the bolt carrier.

At this point, the bolt is locked into the barrel extension by locking lugs, so the expanding gas forces the bolt carrier backward a short distance. As the bolt carrier moves toward the butt of the gun, the bolt cam pin, riding in a slot on the bolt carrier, forces the bolt to rotate and thus unlocks it from the barrel extension. Once the bolt is fully unlocked, it begins its rearward movement along with the bolt carrier. The bolt's rearward motion extracts the empty cartridge case from the chamber. As soon as the neck of the case clears the barrel extension, the bolt's spring-loaded ejector forces it out the ejection port in the side of the upper receiver.

Behind the bolt carrier is a plastic or metal buffer, which rests in line with a return spring. The buffer spring begins to push the bolt carrier and bolt back toward the chamber once it is compressed sufficiently. A groove machined into the upper receiver guides the bolt cam pin and prevents it and the bolt from rotating into a closed position. The bolt's locking lugs push a fresh round from the magazine as the bolt moves forward. The round is guided by feed ramps into the chamber. As the bolt's locking lugs move past the barrel extension, the cam pin twists into a pocket milled into the upper receiver. This twisting action follows the groove cut into the carrier and forces the bolt to twist and "lock" into the barrel extension.

Features

Upper receivers
The upper receiver incorporates the fore stock, the charging handle, the forward assist, the gas operating system, the barrel, the bolt and bolt carrier assembly. AR-15s employ a modular design. Thus one upper receiver can quickly and easily be substituted for another. Upper receivers are available with barrels of different weights, lengths, calibers, and rail systems with various sights and accessories. The standard AR-15 rifle uses a  barrel. Although, both shorter  carbine barrels and longer  target barrels are also available.

Early models had barrels with a 1:12 rate of twist for the original .223 Remington,  bullets. Current models have barrels with a 1:9 or 1:7 twist rate for the 5.56×45mm NATO,  bullets.

Lower receivers
The lower receiver incorporates the magazine well, the pistol grip, the buttstock, the buffer and the buffer spring. The lower receiver also contains the trigger, disconnector, hammer and fire selector (collectively known as the fire control group). Full-sized rifles use a fixed buttstock, while carbines generally use an adjustable telescoping buttstock.

The early commercial SP-1 AR-15s used a pair of  diameter receiver push pins, identical to those found on the military rifles. In 1966 the company replaced the front pin with a paired nut and screw hinge using a  pin to prevent shooters from being able to change receivers with military rifles or competitor rifles without the use of an adapter. They resumed production with the smaller and standardized 0.250-inch pin in the mid-1990s.

Sights
The AR-15's most distinctive ergonomic feature is the carrying handle and rear sight assembly on top of the receiver. This is a by-product of the original ArmaLite design, where the carry handle served to protect the charging handle. At closer ranges (typically inside 15–20 meters), the shooter must compensate by aiming high to place shots where desired. The standard AR-15 rifle has a  sight radius. The AR-15 uses an L-type flip, aperture rear sight and it is adjustable with two settings, 0 to 300 meters and 300 to 400 meters. The front sight is a post adjustable for elevation. The rear sight can be adjusted for windage. The sights can be adjusted with a bullet tip or pointed tool. The AR-15 can also mount a scope on the carrying handle. With the advent of the AR-15A2, a new fully adjustable rear sight was added, allowing the rear sight to be dialed in for specific range settings between 300 and 800 meters and to allow windage adjustments without the need of a tool or cartridge. Current versions such as AR-15A4 have a detachable carrying handle and use Picatinny rails, which allows for the use of various scopes and sighting devices.

Muzzle devices
Colt AR-15 rifles most often have a barrel threaded in ″-28 threads to incorporate the use of a muzzle device such as a flash suppressor, sound suppressor or muzzle brake. The initial design, the "duckbill," had three tines or prongs and was prone to breakage and getting entangled in vegetation. The design was later changed to close the end to avoid this problem. Eventually, on the A2 version of the rifle, the bottom port was closed to reduce muzzle climb and prevent dust from rising when the rifle was fired in the prone position. For these reasons, the US military declared this muzzle device a compensator, but it is more commonly known as the "GI", "A2", or "Birdcage" muzzle device. The standard AR15 muzzle device conforms to the STANAG dimensional requirements for firing 22 mm rifle grenades.

Magazines
The Colt AR-15 uses 20- or 30-round staggered-column detachable box magazines. Low-capacity 5- or 10-round magazines are also available to comply with legal restrictions, for hunting, for benchrest shooting or where a larger magazine can be inconvenient.

Comparison to military versions 
The primary distinction between civilian semi-automatic rifles and military models is select fire. Military rifles were produced with firing modes, semi-automatic fire and either fully automatic fire mode or burst fire mode, in which the rifle fires three rounds in succession when the trigger is depressed. Most components are interchangeable between semi-auto and select fire rifles including magazines, sights, upper receiver, barrels and accessories. The military M4 carbine typically uses a  barrel. Civilian rifles commonly have 16-inch or longer barrels to comply with the National Firearms Act.

In order to prevent a civilian semi-automatic AR-15 from being readily converted for use with the select fire components, Colt changed a number of features. Parts changed include the lower receiver, bolt carrier, hammer, trigger, disconnector, and safety/mode selector. The semi-automatic bolt carrier has a longer lightening slot to prevent the bolt's engagement with an automatic sear. Due to a decrease in mass the buffer spring is heavier. On the select fire version, the hammer has an extra spur which interacts with the additional auto-sear that holds it back until the bolt carrier group is fully in battery, when automatic fire is selected. Using a portion of the select fire parts in a semi-automatic rifle will not enable a select fire option. As designed by Colt the pins supporting the semi-auto trigger and hammer in the lower receiver are larger than those used in the military rifle to prevent interchangeability between semi-automatic and select fire components.

AR-15 style rifle

After Colt's patents expired in 1977, other manufacturers began to copy the design of the Colt AR-15. The term "AR-15" is a Colt registered trademark which it uses only to refer to its line of semi-automatic rifles. Other manufacturers marketed generic AR-15s under other designations, frequently referred to as AR-15s, as are some rifles and carbines not based on the AR-15 design.

AR-15 style rifles are available in a wide range of configurations and calibers from a large number of manufacturers. These configurations range from standard full-size rifles with 20-inch barrels, to short carbine-length models with 16-inch barrels, adjustable length stocks and optical sights, to long range target models with 24-inch barrels, bipods and high-powered scopes. These rifles may also have short-stroke gas piston system, forgoing the direct gas system standard in AR-15 rifles. These calibers include the 5.56×45mm NATO, 5.7×28mm, 6.8mm Remington SPC, .300 Blackout, 9×19mm Parabellum and .458 SOCOM to name a few.

Use in mass shootings
From April 28 to 29, 1996, Martin Bryant killed 35 and injured 23 in the Port Arthur massacre, during which he used a Colt AR-15 and a .308 L1A1 SLR. It was the worst mass shooting in modern Australian history and resulted in the 1996 National Firearms Agreement.

Legality
The Colt AR-15 is banned by name in California with a list of additional AR-style and AK-style firearms in the Kasler v. Lockyer Assault Weapons List. This list deems the Colt AR-15, as well as the Armalite AR-15, Bushmaster XM-15, DPMS Panther, and many other AR-style rifles as assault weapons by name, thus illegal to own/possess in the state of California. The rifle is banned in Maryland as well.

Gallery

See also 

 ArmaLite AR-15
 ArmaLite AR-18
 Assault weapon
 Assault weapons legislation in the United States
 CAR-15
 Colt Automatic Rifle
 List of Colt AR-15 and M16 rifle variants
 Modern sporting rifle
 Roberti–Roos Assault Weapons Control Act of 1989

References

Bibliography

 Stevens, R. Blake and Edward C. Ezell. The Black Rifle M16 Retrospective. Enhanced second printing. Cobourg, Ontario, Canada: Collector Grade Publications Incorporated, 1994. .
 Bartocci, Christopher R. Black Rifle II The M16 Into the 21st Century. Cobourg, Ontario, Canada: Collector Grade Publications Incorporated, 2004. .

External links

ArmaLite AR-10 derivatives
Colt rifles
5.56 mm firearms
Semi-automatic rifles
AR-15 style rifles
Gas-operated firearms